Vaughn Johnson (born 2 September 1960) is a New Zealand former cricketer. He played 27 first-class and 20 List A matches for Otago between 1984 and 1991.

See also
 List of Otago representative cricketers

References

External links
 

1960 births
Living people
New Zealand cricketers
Otago cricketers
Cricketers from Dunedin